"Mirror of Love" is a song by Dutch Eurodance group 2 Brothers on the 4th Floor featuring rapper D-Rock and singer Des'Ray. It was released in 1996 as the fourth single from their second album, 2 (1996), peaking at number six in the Netherlands, number 19 in Finland, number 22 in Belgium and number 44 in Sweden. On the Eurochart Hot 100, the song reached number 90 in August 1996.

Track listing
 12" single, France (1996)
"Mirror of Love" (Extended Version) – 4:26
"Mirror of Love" (Mastermindz Freaky R&B Clubmix) – 5:17

 CD single, Netherlands (1996)
"Mirror of Love" (Radio Version) – 3:29
"Mirror of Love" (2 Fabiola Radio Mix) – 3:48

 CD maxi, Netherlands (1996)
"Mirror of Love" (Radio Version) – 3:29
"Mirror of Love" (Mastermindz R&B Radio Remix) – 3:47
"Mirror of Love" (Fabiola Radio Mix) – 3:48
"Mirror of Love" (Extended Version) – 4:26
"Mirror of Love" (Mastermindz Freaky R&B Clubmix) – 5:17
"Mirror of Love" (Fabiola Clubmix) – 5:05

Charts

References

 

1996 singles
1996 songs
2 Brothers on the 4th Floor songs
CNR Music singles
Electro songs
English-language Dutch songs